The Taupo Bank (also previously known as Mont Taupo,Taupo Guyot or Taupo Tablemount) is an extinct volcanic seamount of the Tasmantid Seamount Chain.

The sediments deposited on top of the alkali olivine basalt originate from the Late Miocene. It was likely a coral-capped volcanic seamount during the Pleistocene low sea level. It was described as a seamount in 1961.

The waters above it are incorporated in the Central Eastern Marine Park, an Australian marine park.

References

Seamounts of the Tasman Sea
Guyots
Hotspot volcanoes
Polygenetic volcanoes
Miocene volcanoes
Volcanoes of the Tasman Sea